The Supreme Court of the United States handed down nine per curiam opinions during its 2001 term, which began October 1, 2001, and concluded October 6, 2002.

Because per curiam decisions are issued from the Court as an institution, these opinions all lack the attribution of authorship or joining votes to specific justices. All justices on the Court at the time the decision was handed down are assumed to have participated and concurred unless otherwise noted.

Court membership

Chief Justice: William Rehnquist

Associate Justices: John Paul Stevens, Sandra Day O'Connor, Antonin Scalia, Anthony Kennedy, David Souter, Clarence Thomas, Ruth Bader Ginsburg, Stephen Breyer

Adarand Constructors, Inc. v. Mineta

Sao Paulo State of Federative Republic of Brazil v. American Tobacco Co.

Mathias v. WorldCom Technologies, Inc.

Horn v. Banks

Kirk v. Louisiana

Stewart v. Smith

United States v. Bass

See also 
 List of United States Supreme Court cases, volume 534
 List of United States Supreme Court cases, volume 535
 List of United States Supreme Court cases, volume 536

Notes

References

 

United States Supreme Court per curiam opinions
Lists of 2001 term United States Supreme Court opinions
2001 per curiam